Petter may refer to:

People:
Petter (given name)
W. E. W. Petter, English aircraft designer
Arlie Petters, a Belizean-American mathematical physicist
Tom Petters, former CEO and chairman of Petters Group Worldwide

Place names:
Petter Bay, a bay on Coronation Island, in the South Orkney Islands, in Scotland

In business:
Lister Petter, a British manufacturer of internal combustion engines
Petters Limited, a former manufacturer of internal combustion engines, and one of Lister Petter's predecessors
Petters Group Worldwide, a diversified company headquartered in Minnetonka, Minnesota

Other:
The Petter Chamor, a mitzvah in Judaism
Petter Dass Museum, a museum in Alstahaug, Norway dedicated to Lutheran priest and poet Petter Dass